Colos may refer to:

Colos (Odemira), a parish in the municipality of Odemira, Portugal
Colos (rapper), an Albanian rapper
Francois Colos (Ferencz Szalay; 1933–1989), Hungarian-born American designer and artist

See also
Colo (disambiguation)